"Every Day" is a 2001 song recorded by the American singer/songwriter Stevie Nicks and written by producer John Shanks and Damon Johnson. It was released as the first single from her solo album, Trouble in Shangri-La. The song peaked at No. 17 on the Billboard Adult Contemporary chart and No. 39 on the Billboard Adult Top 40 chart. Nicks performed this song as well as "Landslide" on The Rosie O'Donnell Show in 2001.

A music video was made for the song in 2001. The video with an added commentary was featured on Crystal Visions – The Very Best of Stevie Nicks in 2006.

The song's co-writer Damon Johnson released his own version of the song on his 2010 album Release.

Charts

Personnel

Stevie Nicks - vocals, percussion
Lori Nicks - backing vocals
Sharon Celani - backing vocals
John Shanks - guitars, programming, bass 
Patrick Warren - keyboards
Rami Jaffe - keyboards
Steve Ferrone - drums

References

''Crystal Visions – The Very Best of Stevie Nicks, liner notes and commentary

Stevie Nicks songs
2001 singles
2001 songs
Songs written by John Shanks
Song recordings produced by John Shanks
Songs written by Damon Johnson
Modern Records (1980) singles